Guinguinéo Department is one of the 45 departments of Senegal, and one of three which form the Kaolack Region. It was created by decree in 2008.

The department has three communes; Guinguinéo, Fass and Mboss

Districts
The rural districts (communautés rurales) comprise:
Mbadakhoune Arrondissement:
 Khelcom Birane
 Mbadakhoune
 Ndiago
 Ngathie Naoudé
Nguélou Arrondissement:
 Gagnick
 Nguélou
 Ourour
 Dara Mboss
 Panal Wolof

Departments of Senegal
Kaolack Region